The Church of Our Lady of the Mount Carmel, popularly known as Iglesia del Cordón, is a Roman Catholic parish church in Montevideo, Uruguay.

Overview
The original church was established 1 October 1835. In 1874-1890 its parish priest was Mariano Soler, who later became the first Archbishop of Montevideo.

The present church was built in 1924 by architect Elzeario Boix in Neo-Romanesque style and is dedicated to Our Lady of Mount Carmel, a very popular devotion of the Virgin Mary. Inside can be also found an altar dedicated to St. Joseph of Cupertino, patron of poor students, and another to the Virgin of the Thirty-Three, patron of Uruguay.

Outside is placed a Galician cruceiro from 1800, the oldest in Uruguay.

Same devotion
There are other churches in Uruguay dedicated to Our Lady of the Mount Carmel:
 Church of Our Lady of Mt. Carmel
 Church of Our Lady of Mt. Carmel (Aguada)
 Church of Our Lady of Mt. Carmel and St. Saint Thérèse of Lisieux (Prado)
 Church of Our Lady of Mt. Carmel and St. Cajetan
 Church of Our Lady of Mt. Carmel in Migues
 Church of Our Lady of Mt. Carmel in Toledo
 Church of Our Lady of Mt. Carmel in Capilla del Sauce
 Church of Our Lady of Mt. Carmel in Durazno
 Church of Our Lady of Mt. Carmel in Villa del Carmen
 Church of Our Lady of Mt. Carmel in Melo
 Church of Our Lady of Mt. Carmel in San Gregorio de Polanco
 Church of Our Lady of Mt. Carmel in Solís de Mataojo
 Church of Our Lady of Mt. Carmel in Carmelo
 Church of Our Lady of Mt. Carmel in Salto

References

External links

Cordón, Montevideo
1835 establishments in Uruguay
Roman Catholic church buildings in Montevideo
Roman Catholic churches completed in 1924
Romanesque Revival church buildings in Uruguay
Our Lady of Mount Carmel
20th-century Roman Catholic church buildings in Uruguay